Edişə or Edişa or Edisha or Yedysha may refer to:
 Edişə, Jalilabad, Azerbaijan
 Edişa, Khojavend, Azerbaijan